Brett Gilbert Scharffs (born March 22, 1963) is the Rex E. Lee Chair and Professor of Law at J. Reuben Clark Law School, part of Brigham Young University (BYU).  He is also the Director of the International Center for Law and Religion Studies.

Scharffs is a son of professor Gilbert W. Scharffs.  He received a BS/BA and an MA from Georgetown University and then went to Oxford University as a Rhodes Scholar.  He then received his J.D. degree from the Yale Law School where he was a senior editor of the Yale Law Journal.

Scharffs was then a law clerk for Judge David B. Sentelle of the United States Court of Appeals for the District of Columbia Circuit.  Prior to joining the BYU faculty Scharffs taught at George Washington University Law School.

Scharffs has largely focused on international law and religious law issues.  He has written more than 100 articles and book chapters and made over 300 scholarly presentations in 30 countries.  He has also co-authored works with colleague, professor Cole Durham.  He has also served as chair of the law and religion section of the Association of American Law Schools.

Sources
BYU Law School faculty profile of Scharffs
listing of BYU Law School faculty
list of articles by Scharffs
Aspen Publishers bio of Scharffs

References

1963 births
Georgetown University alumni
American Rhodes Scholars
Yale Law School alumni
George Washington University faculty
Brigham Young University faculty
Living people